Football Club Drava Ptuj or simply FC Drava Ptuj is a Slovenian football club based in Ptuj that competes in the Slovenian Third League, the third tier of Slovenian football. The club was founded in 2004 and is legally not considered to be the successor of NK Drava Ptuj, and the statistics and honours of the two clubs are kept separate by the Football Association of Slovenia.

Honours

Ptuj Super League (fourth tier)
 Winners: 2012–13

MNZ Ptuj Cup
 Winners: 2014–15, 2016–17, 2017–18, 2019–20

League history

References

External links
Official website 

Association football clubs established in 2004
Football clubs in Slovenia
2004 establishments in Slovenia